The Limerick–Tralee line, also known as the North Kerry line, is a former railway line from Limerick railway station to Tralee railway station in Ireland. It also has branch lines to Foynes and Fenit. Much of the line today has now been converted into a greenway, the Great Southern Trail.

History
The Limerick and Foynes Railway, starting at a junction just outside  to  some  distant via Ballingrane Junction.  The Rathkeale and Newcastle Junction Company were responsible for the section  section from Ballingrane Junction to Newcastle West with the Limerick and Kerry Railway Company taking responsibility for remainder of the line to Tralee which opened in December 1880.  All sections were operated by the W&LR as they opened.  An additional  branch opened from Tralee to Fenit in 1887.

At  the Great Southern and Western Railway (GS&WR) line approached from the east while the W&LR came in from the northwest, the two lines being connected but each initially having their own independent station until 1907.

During 1901, the WL&WR was bought by the GS&WR. But during the grouping of 1925, the GS&WR was merged with three other companies to form the Great Southern Railways. After the war, the Transport Act 1944 dissolved the GSR and brought its assets into the ownership of Córas Iompair Éireann on 1 January 1945. The line stayed in the ownership of CIÉ until the line was closed to passengers on 4 February 1963 and for freight up to Listowel in 1977 and to Tralee on 6 February 1978.

The Foynes–Limerick section of the line was open to freight traffic until 2001, when it was closed and mothballed. In November 2022, it was announced that work had begun on restoring the line, which is scheduled to reopen to freight in 2025, with the possibility of passenger services being restored at a later date.

Route
The line travelled through the countryside of County Limerick and County Kerry, linking the city of Limerick and the town of Tralee with towns primarily along the N21 road corridor. It began at Colbert station in Limerick, and passed through: Patrickswell, where a branch line connected with the Dublin-Cork railway line, Adare, a second branch connected with the freight port at Foynes diverging at Ballingrane Junction, Rathkeale, Newcastle West, Abbeyfeale, Listowel, where a connection was made with the Lartigue Monorail to Ballybunnion, Lixnaw, Abbeydorney, Ardfert, and finally Tralee, where trains continued to Killarney and Mallow, and a branch line went to Fenit.

Notes

References

Sources
 
 

Closed railways in Ireland
Railway lines opened in 1880